Rodrigo Armando Lara Sánchez (born 9 March 1971) is a Colombian politician and physician who was mayor of Neiva from 2016 to 2019. Lara Sánchez was the vice presidential candidate of Federico Gutiérrez of the Team for Colombia coalition in the 2022 presidential election, which they ended on third place.

References 

Living people
1971 births
People from Huila Department
University of Cauca alumni